Fahs-Anjra is a province located in the Tanger-Tetouan-Al Hoceima Region of Morocco. It was created by Royal decree in 2003. Its population in 2004 was 97,295.

A new city, Ch'rafate, is currently being built there. It was announced by the king in 2009 and should be complete by 2020.

Subdivisions
The prefecture is divided administratively into the following:

References

 
Provinces of Tanger-Tetouan-Al Hoceima